Frogmore and Sherford is a civil parish in Devon, England. Within it are the villages of Frogmore and Sherford. The parish was created in 1986 from Sherford and parts of South Pool and Charleton.

Description
Frogmore and Sherford is a civil parish in the South Hams local government district of the county of Devon, England. It comprises the two villages of Frogmore and Sherford. Frogmore is at the head of a tidal creek of the Kingsbridge Estuary, and Sherford is one mile to the north.

Frogmore and Sherford is surrounded by the parishes of Kingsbridge to the west, Buckland-Tout-Saints to the northwest, East Allington to the north, Stokenham to the east, South Pool to the south and completely surrounds the parish of Charleton to the southwest.

Notes

Civil parishes in South Hams